The 2010–11 Slovak Cup was the forty-second season of Slovakia's annual knock-out football cup competition and the eighteenth since the independence of Slovakia. It began on 23 August 2010 and will ended on 8 May 2011 with the final. As the 22nd ranked league system using the UEFA coefficient, the winners of the competition will earn a place in the third qualifying round of the UEFA Europa League.

ŠK Slovan Bratislava won the cup after beating Žilina 5–4 on penalties.

Calendar

First round
The games were played on Tuesday, 24 August 2010 and Wednesday, 25 August 2010. Forty teams competed in this round – the 12 competing teams in the Slovak First League (second tier) and 28 teams from the Slovak Second League.  Participants were divided into a West division and East division in this stage.

|}

Second round
The draw for the second round was held in September 2010.  Nine of the sixteen games were held on Tuesday, 21 September 2010, six on Wednesday, 22 September 2010, and one on Tuesday, 28 September 2010. In this round, the 12 teams from the Slovak Superliga joined the 20 winners from Round 1.

|}

Third round
The sixteen winners of the second round competed in the third round.  The draw for the third round was held on 8 October 2010. Games were played on 19 October 2010, with the exception of the ŠK SFM Senec/MŠK Žilina match, which will be played on 26 October 2010.

|}

Quarter-finals
The eight winners from the third round will compete in the two-legged quarterfinals on 2 and 23 November 2010, with the exception of the MŠK Žilina/Tatran NAO Liptovský Mikuláš matches, which took place on 11 November and 1 December 2010.

|}

Semi-finals
The four winners from the quarterfinals will compete in the two-legged semifinals. The first legs took place on 5 April 2011 and the second legs took place on 19 April 2011.

|}

Final

References

External links
Pro Football (Slovak)

2010-11
2010–11 domestic association football cups
Cup